Hiyya Pontremoli (Smyrna, 17th century - Smyrna, 1823) was a Turkish rabbi and poet, member of the Pontremoli dynasty.

Biography
Hiyya Pontremoli was born in Smyrna from the famous rabbi Benjamin Pontremoli; he was an important rabbi of the Turkish Jewish community in the 19th century. He was an excellent and prolific author, among his most important works include "Ẓappiḥit bi-Debash" and the collection of works on "Oraḥ Ḥayyim". He was descended from the branch of an important family of rabbis of Italian origin who had immigrated to Casale Monferrato in the seventeenth century. From the Italian branch important rabbis were born such as Rav.Eliseo Graziadio Pontremoli (Great Rabbi of Nice), Rav. Gabriel Pontremoli (Chief Rabbi of Turin), Rav.Chakam Esdra Pontremoli (Rabbi of Vercelli).

Bibliography
"Les Pontremoli, deux dynasties rabbiniques en Turquie et en Italie" Parigi,1997 (on-line)
«Benjamin Pontremoli». In: Jewish Encyclopedia, Vol. XIX, 1888 Isidore Singer (on-line)

Notes

Turkish rabbis
Turkish poets
Smyrniote Jews
1823 deaths